The First, the Best and the Last is a compilation album by punk band Sham 69, released in 1980 (see 1980 in music) right after their disbandment.

Track listing
"Borstal Breakout"
"Hey Little Rich Boy"
"Angels with Dirty Faces"
"The Cockney Kids Are Innocent"
"If the Kids Are United"
"Sunday Morning Nightmare"
"Voices (live)"
"Money (live)"
"Hurry Up Harry"
"Questions and Answers"
"Give a Dog a Bone"
"Hersham Boys"
"Tell the Children"
"Unite and Win"
"Who Gives a Damn (live)" (bonus track)
"That's Life (live)" (bonus track)

References

1980 compilation albums
Sham 69 compilation albums
Polydor Records compilation albums